Pramod means joy or happiness in Sanskrit and is one of the names of the Hindu god Ganesh.

People with the name "Pramod":
 Pramod Bhasin, Indian businessman
 Pramod Chakravorty (1929–2004), Indian director and film producer 
 Pramod Dubey, Indian politician
 Pramod Kamble (born 1964), Indian painter and sculptor
 Pramod Kapoor (born 1953), Indian writer and publisher
 Pramod Kharel, Nepalese singer
 Pramod Madushan, Sri Lankan cricketer
 Pramod Mahajan (1949–2006), Indian politician
 Pramod Moutho (born 1955), Indian actor
 Namitha Pramod, Indian actress
 Ranjan Pramod, Indian screenwriter and director
 Pramod Sawant (born 1973), Indian politician
 Pramod Tiwari, Indian politician
 Pramodya Wickremasinghe, Sri Lankan cricketer

See also

References

Indian masculine given names